The state trunkline highways in Michigan are the segments of the State Trunkline Highway System maintained by the Michigan Department of Transportation and numbered with the "M-" prefix officially.


Mainline highways

Special routes

Connectors
Most of the following connectors are unsigned, but they were inventoried publicly as part of the 6th edition of the Michigan Geographic Framework in 2006. Up through the 7th edition, MDOT used a different numbering system, which was changed in May 2008 with the publication of the 8th edition. The years below note when each connector was established as an individual component of the highway system.

See also

References

Footnotes

Works cited

External links

Michigan Highways

 s
State trunklines